The Hirashima class is a class of coastal minesweepers of the Japan Maritime Self-Defense Force.

Development 
From the lessons learned from the 1991 dispatch of the Self-Defense Forces to the Persian Gulf, the Maritime Self-Defense Force took the example of the Royal Navy's Sandown class minehunter, built after the 1994 plan, especially in order to improve its capabilities regarding mine clearance. However, while the Sandown class is basically a minesweeper that does not have minesweeping ability. The waters around Japan have many muddy seabeds that are not suitable for minesweeping, and abandonment of minesweeping ability is unacceptable. For this reason, the class is also given the ability to sweep with Australian-made DYAD-sensitive minesweepers, but due to magnetic management issues, it was decided that it would not be installed all the time, but would be received from the mother ship at sea as needed. Operational restrictions were large, and mobility was also restricted.

For this reason, it was built as a new type of minesweeper equipped with a domestic system that has the same performance as the overseas-made minesweeping system equipped in the Sugashima class, as well as realizing the installation of minesweepers on its own boat.

Ships in the class

Citations 

Ships built in Japan
Minesweepers of the Japan Maritime Self-Defense Force